= Recycling (disambiguation) =

Recycling may refer to:

== Science ==
- Recycling (technological) A human industrial process of shunting discarded technological artifacts into an industrial repository system that dissipates energy and employs people to manufacture and redistribute new artifacts using the old materials.
- Recycling (ecological) Ecosystems use energy (primarily solar) to employ biodiversity working at the base of food webs to recycle mineral nutrients back into living systems.
